Wang Haibo may refer to:

 Wang Haibo (basketball) (王海波), competed in the 1984 Summer Olympics
 Wang Haibo (swimmer) (汪海波), competed in the 2004 Summer Olympics